Yekaterina Vladimirovna Shishova (Екатерина Владимировна Шишова, born 13 September 1978) was a Russian-Ukrainian female water polo player. She was a member of the Russia women's national water polo team, playing as a centre back.

She was a part of the Russian team at the 2003 World Aquatics Championships , and 2004 Summer Olympics.

She was a part of the Ukrainian team at the 2007 World Aquatics Championships.

On club level she played for Uralochka Zlatoust in Russia.

See also
 List of World Aquatics Championships medalists in water polo

References

External links
 

1978 births
Living people
Russian female water polo players
Water polo players at the 2004 Summer Olympics
Olympic water polo players of Russia
People from Zlatoust
Sportspeople from Chelyabinsk Oblast
21st-century Russian women